Yên Sơn may refer to several places in Vietnam, including:

Yên Sơn District, a rural district of Tuyên Quang Province
Yên Sơn, Hanoi, a commune of Quốc Oai District
Yên Sơn, Ninh Bình, a commune of Tam Điệp
Yên Sơn, Lào Cai, a commune of Bảo Yên District
Yên Sơn, Nghệ An, a commune of Đô Lương District
Yên Sơn, Lạng Sơn, a commune of Hữu Lũng District
Yên Sơn, Bắc Giang, a commune of Lục Nam District
Yên Sơn, Phú Thọ, a commune of Thanh Sơn District
Yên Sơn, Cao Bằng, a commune of Thông Nông District
Yên Sơn, Sơn La, a commune of Yên Châu District